Sekolah Menengah Kebangsaan Cyberjaya or National High School of Cyberjaya (SMKC), is a secondary school located in Cyberjaya, Selangor, Malaysia. Its neighbours are the SK Cyberjaya school and the Multimedia University. It was to be built in the area of Sepang, Selangor. SMK Cyberjaya is the concept of school-based IT BRIGHT School and began operations on June 14, 2004 with 4 students, 21 teachers, led by Principal Pioneer Hj. Salahuddin bin Abd. Rasid assisted by Hjh. Hamidah bt. Said as the Senior Administrative Assistant, Hjh. Habshah bt. Mohamad as Senior Assistant Student Affairs (HEM) and Jeyem Thiram a / l Maniam, Senior Assistant General Co-curriculum

Covering an area of 11 acres, SMK Cyberjaya located in areas gazetted as the Multimedia Super Corridor. Even SMK Cyberjaya is part of the plan. In the early stages of this school is a smart school "Level A" but turned into IT BRIGHT school. In accordance with this concept, SMK Cyberjaya provided with advanced equipment and facilities.

In 2015, SMK Cyberjaya became a Trust School (Sekolah Amanah)

SMK Cyberjaya is equipped with the infrastructure and the following:

 Hall
 Surau
 Administration building
 5 academic blocks containing 36 classrooms that can each accommodate 36 students
 A reading corner, a resource center
 Three computer laboratories
 Life skills workshops
 "Self Access Centre" room
 Counselling Room
 Music room
 175 computers and free 4G Internet
 Health and dental rooms
 Cooperative Store 
 Canteen
 SPBT room
 Bus waiting areas covered

Enrollment that began with only 4 students, have now reached 773 people. Both principals, (Datin Fuziah bt. Mahmood) replace Pioneer Principal from September 2007 until 16 December 2012. Starting December 17, 2012 SMK Cyberjaya led by (Norma bt Daud.)

School Logo

Representing 6 Pillars of Excellence
 Excellent Administration
 Excellent Curriculum
 Excellent Co-curriculum
 Excellent Personality
 Excellent Fun
 Excellent Community

Logo Colours
Yellow - majesty and height
Blue - harmony
Green - symbol of fertility; the school was built on the Green Book Program site
Purple - the official colour of Malaysian Smart Schools

List of principals
 Md. Salehuddin bin Abd Rasid (2004-2006)
 Datin Fuziah binti Mahmood (2006-2012)
 Hjh. Norma binti Daud (2012-2014)
 Ng Sie Fong (2014–2015)
 Nurul Aini Chan binti Abdullah (2015–2020)
 Hjh Sharifah Hanim binti Syed Zain (2020 - 2021)
 Ustaz Salehin bin Abdullah (2022 - current)

Achievements
 2006
 Sepak Takraw Championships MSSD Sepang
Men under 15 (third place)
2010
 Cerita Digital (CerDig)

 Cyber Crew Production wins 1st place for Secondary School Categories

 Group Members:
 1. Afiq Akmal
 2. Awangku Mohd Akmal
 3. Mohd Nasrullah
 4. Nurul Natasya
 5. Raja Nurdiyana

2011
 MSSD Tenpin Bowling Sepang
 
  BOYS UNDER 15  
   
 1. Muhammad Nur Hazarizq' - Gold Medalist
  
2. Mohamad Tatan Iqram - Bronze Medalist
   
3. Team Event - Gold Medal

  GIRLS UNDER 15   
1. Nur Amira Bt Mazlan - Gold Medalist

2. Team Event - Silver medal

Sepak Takraw..
 Muhammad Faisal Mahadi , Haikal , Safwan , Zulhelmy , Hamizan , Akmal Hut , Khalid Samad , Muhd Fikri .

2012 
Olahraga, Kevin Lee Nathaniel

• Tempat Ketiga Puisi dan Lagu Peringkat Daerah

2013
Bicara Berirama -State Champion and Best Conductor (Riyshmaa Devendaran)
2014
• Johan Puisi dan Lagu peringkat daerah

2015
International Youth Exchange Programme Between Red Crescent Malaysia & Red Cross Korea
 Muhamad Qayyum Azead bin Norazran & Muhammad Azzimuddin bin Ariefuleddin

• Johan Masters Bowling Tenpin MSSN Selangor - Muhammad Nur Hazarizq (mewakili negeri Selangor ke MSSM)
2016
Merentas Desa (MSSD Sepang - Keseluruhan - Tempat Ketiga)
2017
National ICT Security Discourse Challenge (NICTSeD) 2017  (Peringkat Kebangsaan - Johan)
2018
Shell Road Safety Movement #ShellSelamatSampai School Challenge 2018 (Peringkat Kebangsaan - Johan)
2020
 Bola Keranjang (MSSD Sepang-Tempat Pertama)

See also
List of schools in Malaysia

Sepang District
Schools in Selangor